The Kanab Creek Trail is a hiking trail on the North Rim of the Grand Canyon National Park, located in the U.S. state of Arizona.
It is named after the adjacent Kanab Creek.

See also
 The Grand Canyon
 List of trails in Grand Canyon National Park

Photo gallery

External links
 Kaibab National Forest Ranger Trail #59, in Kanab Creek from Snake Gulch to Jensen Canyon and beyond.
 Travelogue of backpacking trip in Kanab Creek
 Hiking guide to Kanab Creek
 U.S. Geological Survey 1:250,000 map, Grand Canyon, Arizona, NJ 12-10 Series V502, Edition 3, 1953 revised 1970. (8 MB download)

Hiking trails in Grand Canyon National Park
Grand Canyon, North Rim
Grand Canyon, North Rim (west)